The Elcar was an American automobile manufactured from 1915 until 1931. The car was produced by the Elkhart Carriage Company, owned by William and George Pratt, of Elkhart, Indiana, which had been in business for over 30 years before producing its first car.

Production

This first car was the 30/35 hp Elkhart, which began production in 1905 and remained on the market until 1909. In 1909 the 4·2 liter Sterling appeared (it ceased production in 1911), followed in 1911 by the Komet.

The Elcar appeared in 1915, and was first offered in two models, a Lycoming-engined four and a Continental-engined six. A straight-eight, again with a Continental engine, was produced beginning in 1925. In 1930, the company began to use the complex Lever engine produced by Alvah Leigh Powell, although only four Elcar-Levers were completed.

New York City contract
It next entered a lucrative contract within New York City, under which it would supply "El-Fay" taxis to Larry Fay, a prominent businessman and club owner with known mob ties.

Production model specifications
 Elcar Seven Passenger Sedan-8-80

Company demise
Fay's resources were badly hit by the Great Depression, and Fay himself was eventually shot dead in 1933 by a disgruntled employee. Bankruptcy trustee and interim president Arthur Martin Graffis led a two-year campaign to attract investors and save the company including a project to market the 1930 Elcar as a 1931 Mercer. The company was dissolved in 1931, after only two prototypes had been constructed.

References

David Burgess Wise, The New Illustrated Encyclopedia of Automobiles

Defunct motor vehicle manufacturers of the United States
Motor vehicle manufacturers based in Indiana
Defunct companies based in Indiana
Vehicle manufacturing companies established in 1915
American companies established in 1915
1915 establishments in Indiana
Vehicle manufacturing companies disestablished in 1931
American companies disestablished in 1931
1931 disestablishments in Indiana